Jess Imme is a Salvadoran-American singer and musician from Los Angeles, California.

Primarily self-taught, she has recorded and performed with bands including Big Moves and Professor Possessor, drawing attention from critics for her "one-of-a-kind" "clarion vocals". She is also known for collaborations with DJ Hoppa and playwright Gina Young, having appeared as the drummer in Young's musical play sSISTERSs, and also appearing as a singer who "serenades the audience with songs by Chavela Vargas and k.d. lang" in Young's production of Butch Ballet at REDCAT.

References

American people of Salvadoran descent
Musicians from Los Angeles
Living people
Year of birth missing (living people)